Lyubov Denisova (née Belavina; ; born 6 October 1971) is a Russian middle- and long-distance runner. She is an athlete who earned the Russian title of “Master of Sports of International Class,” a winner of multiple major marathons in the United States who served a suspension in 2007-2009 for use of performance-enhancing drugs.

Professional career
Denisova first ran a marathon in 1993, when she finished eighth at the Russian Open Marathon Championship in Kaliningrad, running a 2:42:47.

At the 1996 Russian Open Marathon Championship in Moscow, she became a bronze medalist (2:46:18), losing to Irina Timofeyeva and Lyubov Morgunova. The same year, she ran the Dalian International Marathon (finishing in 2:36:09) and took part in the European Cross Country Championships in Charleroi.

In 2001, she traveled to the United States to race in Grandma's Marathon, a raced named after the Grandma's Restaurant. She started in Two Harbors with thousands of other runners and ran along the shore of Lake Superior to Duluth, Minnesota, leading all the women and winning in 2:35:13. Her win set in motion a Russian woman's dominance of the race for the next four years as Zinaida Semenova and Firiya Sultanova rolled to wins. 

She also won the Long Beach Marathon, took 11th in the Twin Cities Marathon and finished fourth in the Hong Kong Standard Chartered Marathon that year.

In 2002, she won the Los Angeles Marathon (in 2:28:49) and placed second at the New York Marathon coming in one minute behind Joyce Chepchumba, crossing the tape with a time of 2:26:17.

In 2003, she faced the best runners in the world and took the Newton Hills as she stormed to a second-place finish at the Boston Marathon in 2:26:51.

At the 2004 New York City Marathon, she placed third, setting her own personal best of 2:25:18. She was considered as a candidate for participation in the Summer Olympics at Athens, but in the end, the Russian coaching staff chose other runners.

In 2005, she again won the Los Angeles Marathon (2:26:11).

At the 2006 Honolulu Marathon, Denisova ran 2:27:19, a race record.

Denisova tested positive for an elevated testosterone-to-epitestosterone ratio 20 March 2007.
On 15 May 2007 it was announced that she was banned for two years. She has since become a mother and returned to running.

In 2012, 2013 and 2015 she won the Detroit Marathon. In 2017 and 2018, she won the Albany Marathon. In 2018, she won the Miami Marathon.

Personal life 
Denisova graduated from the Volga Region State Academy of Physical Culture, Sports and Tourism. She is a mother and is married to Maxim Denisov, and together they work as a trainers at the Moscow running club, Gepard. Denisova cites Gainesville, Florida as her home in the US.

Achievements
All results regarding marathon, unless stated otherwise

See also
List of sportspeople sanctioned for doping offences

References
Profile

1971 births
Living people
Russian female long-distance runners
Doping cases in athletics
Russian sportspeople in doping cases
Russian female marathon runners